Pozdnyakov (masculine) or Pozdnyakova (feminine), also transliterated as Pozdniakov, is a Russian surname. Notable people with the surname include:

 Anatoly Pozdnyakov (died 2001), Russian general
 Boris Pozdnyakov (born 1962), Russian football player

 Konstantin Pozdniakov (born 1952), Russian linguist
 Stanislav Pozdnyakov (born 1973), Russian fencer

 Vasily Pozdnyakov (1869-1921), Russian conscientious objector and author
 Vyacheslav Pozdnyakov (born 1978), Russian fencer

 See also
 Pozdnyakova

Russian-language surnames